Berlin 2030 klimaneutral is a citizens' initiative launched in Berlin in 2018. It is the subject of a city-wide referendum scheduled for 26 March 2023, commonly called the Klima-Volksentscheid. Voters will be asked whether the Climate Protection and Energy Transition Act of 2016 should be amended. The primary goal of the referendum is to legislate a goal of carbon neutrality by the year 2030, rather than the existing goal of 2045. Since the referendum proposes specific amendments to the law, its result will be legally binding. In order to pass, the proposal must be approved by a majority on the day and receive approval from a quorum of over 25% of registered voters.

Background 

The Berlin constitution recognises and facilitates various forms of direct democracy. At the state level, a Volksinitiative (initiative) obliges the Abgeordnetenhaus of Berlin, the state parliament, to debate a petition if it collects 20,000 signatures. Further, a Volksentscheid (referendum) on an initiative can be called if, during an additional signature-gathering phase, the petition is signed by 7% of registered voters.

The group Klimaneustart Berlin has been active since 2019 with the goal of advancing action on climate change via direct democracy. They first gathered 43,000 signatures calling on the government and parliament to declare a climate emergency, which the Abgeordnetenhaus subsequently did in December. The next year, the group collected 32,000 signatures calling for the establishment of a citizens climate council, comprising citizens chosen by lottery and advised by experts, who would develop recommendations for achieving carbon neutrality in Berlin. The proposal was legislated by the governing coalition in April 2021.

Initiative 
In July 2021, Klimaneustart Berlin launched the Berlin 2030 klimaneutral initiative with the goal of bringing forward the city's net zero goal from 2045 to 2030. Unlike previous initiatives, they intended to seek a referendum on the issue. The petition received 39,000 signatures by October.

In May 2022, the state government rejected the proposal. Deputy mayor and climate minister Bettina Jarasch said that, while she shared the concerns of the initiative, the government preferred concrete measures to achieve climate protection over legislating new targets. She also described neutrality by 2030 as unrealistic if the rest of the country and the European Union were not seeking the same. This rejection enabled the initiative to enter the second signature-gathering phase which would take its proposal to referendum. Support from 7% of registered voters, approximately 171,000 people, was required. The initiative surpassed this hurdle with 260,000 signatures by the end of the gathering period in mid-November.

The state government rejected proposals that the referendum take place alongside the repeat state election on 12 February 2023. They stated that organisation and procedural efforts could not be completed in time, and that holding the votes simultaneously could disrupt the voting process and result in irregularities, though the Greens and Left factions dissented. The referendum date was set for 26 March, six weeks after the state election.

Provisions 
The referendum provides for several changes to the Berlin Climate Protection and Energy Transition Act:

 Changing the greenhouse gas emissions reduction goal to 70% from 1990 levels by 2025, and 95% by 2030. This is in contrast to the current goal of 70% by 2030 and 95% by 2045 and applies specifically to carbon dioxide emissions.
 Several provisions are to become binding obligations instead of targets.
 Tenants should receive monthly subsidies in the event of rent increases.
 Public buildings are to be renovated with clean energy systems by 2030. Measures for implementing renewable energy in buildings, such as rooftop solar panels, are to be strengthened.

Campaign

The initiators of the referendum cite the consequences and damage of climate change as the reason for the need to change the law. They state that climate neutrality will ensure energy independence and future-proof jobs in the region. In addition, 100 European cities have already committed to climate neutrality by 2030. The initiative also cites several feasibility studies that argue the goal is possible. A study published by the Energy Watch Group in late 2021 suggests that Berlin could source its energy needs entirely from renewable sources, provided that areas in surrounding Brandenburg are also utilised. A study commissioned from the Fraunhofer IEE institute published the same year attests that entirely climate-neutral heating could be supplied by 2035, and possibly earlier. A catalog of measures by GermanZero also proposes various local solutions to achieve the desired reduction in emissions.

Opinion polling 
A Civey poll of 3,002 Berliners conducted between 20 January and 17 February 2023 found 46.3% supported the referendum question, 42.1% opposed, and 11.6% undecided. Strong support came from Green voters (94.5%), students (76%), and Left voters (67%). 57.5% of SPD voters also favoured the referendum, compared to only 15% of CDU voters.

External links

References 

Referendum
2023 referendums
2023